Klavs Bruun Jørgensen (born 3 April 1974) is a Danish handball player and coach. As a player, he led FCK Håndbold to the Danish championship in May 2008. He has previously played for many years by Danish Handball League rivals GOG, with whom he won two Danish titles. For a short period he played for German league side SG Wallau-Massenheim

In his coaching career he has coached several men danish side clubs such as AG København, Nordsjælland Håndbold and Team Tvis Holstebro. On 13 January 2015 DHF announced the Klavs Bruun Jørgensen would take over as head coach of the danish women's national team as of 1 June 2015.

Jørgensen has played 168 matches for the Danish national handball team, and participated in the 2002 and 2004 European Men's Handball Championship, both times securing bronze medals.

Jørgensen is married to fellow handball player Rikke Hørlykke.

References

External links
 
 
 
  

1974 births
Living people
Danish male handball players
Danish handball coaches
Olympic handball players of Denmark
Handball players at the 2008 Summer Olympics
Handball players from Copenhagen
Expatriate handball players
Danish expatriate sportspeople in Germany
Handball-Bundesliga players
Handball coaches of international teams